"Get Free" is a song by the Australian garage rock band the Vines from their debut album Highly Evolved. The song was released in mid 2002, and remains the Vines' highest-charting single (#7 Billboard Modern Rock, #24 UK Singles Chart).

Track listing

Composition 
"Get Free" features Nicholls strumming the 5th and 3rd frets for the main riff. The song opens with the resounding riff, a drum-build up and then the song breaks in. However, the song does not follow a verse-chorus-verse structure, going from verse-chorus-solo-verse-bridge-middle-verse-chorus.

Music videos

There were two promotional videos shot for "Get Free". The more commonly known music video, directed by Roman Coppola, shows the band standing, surrounded by huge spotlights, on a hill with a lightning storm brewing above. As the video develops, lightning bolts begin to strike the ground with increasing intensity. Eventually, during the final chorus, lightning strikes the drummer Hamish Rosser's cymbal, bassist Patrick Matthews and then Nicholls sending Matthews and Nicholls flying in different directions while the drummer sits behind his set.

Charts

References

ARIA Award-winning songs
The Vines (band) songs
2002 singles
Songs written by Craig Nicholls
2002 songs
EMI Records singles
Capitol Records singles
Music videos directed by Roman Coppola